Joakim Demmer (born 11 October 1965), is a Swedish filmmaker, screenwriter, cinematographer and editor. He is best known for directing the documentary films Dead Donkeys Fear No Hyenas.

Personal life
Demmer was born on 11 October 1965 in Nybro, Stockholm, Sweden.

Career
He studied photography and documentary film from Biskops-Arnö, Sweden in 1989. Since then, he continued to work as a self-employed cameraman in Stockholm, Prague and London. Later in 1991, he settled in Stockholm and continued to work as a television cameraman and editor. But in 1992, Demmer moved to Oslo with a new job in the television news section as a cameraman and editor at TV2 (currently known as SVT2). Gradually, he became the co-director of the documentary department of the television. In 1995, he attended Deutsche Film- und Fernsehakademie Berlin to study filmmaking where he finally graduated in 2002. In the graduation year, he directed the film Tarifa Traffic about the refugees on the coast of Tarifa. The film was screened at many film festivals and adjudged with many awards.

With that success, he directed the second documentary Anna Lindh und ihr Mörder. In 2006, he made his maiden television directorial with three episodes of the series Fremde Kinder. Then in 2014, he wrote and directed the documentary Der Sonnenkönig der Massai. In 2017, he directed the documentary Dead Donkeys Fear No Hyenas as a joint production with Ethiopia, Germany, Finland and Netherlands. The film revolves around Farmland , the new green gold in Ethiopia where foreign investors use millions of hectares and dream of prosperity of the local people. The film received mixed reviews from critics and made official selection at many film festivals. In the Munich International Documentary Festival (DOK.fest) 2017, the film was nominated for the Viktor Award for DOK.horizons and then for Environmental Award at the Sheffield International Documentary Festival.

Filmography

Award and accolades
He has received several award for his critics acclaimed documentaries.

 Prix Suisse TSR, Visions du Réel, Nyon
 1st Prix du Concours Européen Le Mans
 21st Robert-Geisendörfer-Preis
 Duisburger Filmwoche Audience Award
 San Francisco Green Film Festival - Green Tenacity Award
 Dokfest Munich - Honorable Mention
 One World Film Award NRW - 1st prize . Prize, 2017
 Life After Oil, Best International Documentary Award
 Innsbruck Nature Film Festival - Best Film on the topic of soil
 SIMA Award, Los Angeles
 Grimme Preis 2020

References

External links
 

Living people
Swedish film directors
German film directors
Swedish screenwriters
1965 births